41st Century Splendid Man is an album by Acid Mothers Temple & The Melting Paraiso U.F.O., released in 2002 by tUMULt Records and a limited edition picture disc. The album's name is a play on King Crimson's probably most popular song  "21st Century Schizoid Man." The album was re-released on CD in 2007 by Essence Music with new artwork and extra tracks. The re-release is titled 41st Century Splendid Man Returns.

Track listing

41st Century Splendid Man

41st Century Splendid Man Returns

Personnel
 Cotton Casino – vocal
 Tsuyama Atsushi – Tibetan trumpet, bass, synthesizer, bass harmonica
 Higashi Hiroshi – synthesizer
 Koizumi Hajime – percussion
 Kawabata Makoto – guitar, synthesizer, violin, sarangi, electric sitar, bowed sitar, zurna, RDS900

Additional personnel
 Yoko – space phone girl
 Ayano – cosmic companion
 Yoshida Tatsuya – drums

Technical personnel
Artwork – Jason Killinger, Kawabata Sachiko, Uirajara Resende 
Producer, Engineer – Kawabata Makoto

References

Acid Mothers Temple albums
2002 albums